Justice Talking was a weekly radio show, syndicated on National Public Radio and hosted by Margot Adler, that tackled the law and public policy.  A signature element of the program was its debate segment.  

It was the flagship of a multi-media civic education initiative online, in print and in classrooms. Justice Talking was produced by the Annenberg Public Policy Center, a think tank at the University of Pennsylvania's School for Communications.  

Justice Talking'''s last show aired on June 30, 2008. According to the producer, the program has ceased production due to lack of funding.

 Justice Learning web site Justice Talking has a partnership with The New York Times Learning Network to produce a free website for students and teachers that discusses legal debates that affect Americans. It is called Justice Learning''.

References

External links
Justice Talking
Justice Learning

University of Pennsylvania
NPR programs

1999 radio programme debuts 
2008 radio programme endings